Live Vengeance '82 is a live DVD and UMD of a Judas Priest concert recorded on 12 December 1982, at the Mid-South Coliseum in Memphis, Tennessee. It was released on 4 April 2006 in both an Amaray case and a limited edition digipak. The first release on DVD had been in 2004 as Disc 5 of the Metalogy compilation box-set, which came in a simple card-sleeve.

The footage was originally released on VHS, and later on laserdisc, as Judas Priest Live. The Japanese laserdisc omitted "Diamonds And Rust" and "The Green Manalishi (With the Two Pronged Crown)", giving it a running-time of 84 minutes. This version comes in a CX encoded analogue soundtrack and doesn't have a digital soundtrack. The track listing misprints "Devil's Child" as "Davil's Child".

"Screaming for Vengeance" appears as a bonus track on the 2001 re-issue of Priest...Live! and "Devil's Child" appears on the 2012 re-issue of Screaming for Vengeance.

The DVD was re-released in 2009 as part of the label's "Visual Milestones" series.

Track listing

Encore 1

Encore 2

Personnel
Judas Priest
Rob Halford - Vocals
K. K. Downing - Guitars
Glenn Tipton - Guitars
Ian Hill - Bass
Dave Holland - Drums

Production
Paul Natkin - Photography
Neal Preston - Photography
Geoffrey Thomas - Photography
David Axtell - Artwork, Design
Mick Anger - Director
Jayne Andrews - Coordinator

References

Judas Priest video albums
2006 video albums
Live video albums
2006 live albums